Jaroslav Špindler (21 April 1890 – 1965) was a Bohemian-Austrian footballer who played as a forward and appeared for both the Bohemia and Austria national teams.

Career
Špindler earned his first and only cap for Bohemia on 5 April 1908 in a friendly match against Hungary, which finished as a 2–5 loss in Budapest. He later represented the Austria national team, making his only appearance on 10 September 1911 in a friendly against Germany. He scored Austria's second goal in the match, which finished as a 2–1 win in Dresden.

Career statistics

International

International goals

References

External links
 
 
 

1890 births
1965 deaths
Date of death missing
Czech footballers
Czech Republic international footballers
Austrian footballers
Austria international footballers
Dual internationalists (football)
Association football forwards
AC Sparta Prague players
Teplitzer FK players
Bohemia international footballers